Elm Street Court is a bungalow court located on Elm Street in Urbana, Champaign County, Illinois.

The court, built in 1926, consists of eight Spanish Colonial Revival style bungalows arranged around a central courtyard. While the houses have similar styles and floor plans, they also all have key differences, such as the shape of their parapet walls and the color and style of their stucco exteriors.

The bungalow court was a popular housing style in California and Florida during the 1920s, but the Elm Street Court is one of the few examples of the style in the Midwest.

The court was added to the National Register of Historic Places on June 15, 2000.

See also

National Register of Historic Places listings in Champaign County, Illinois

References

Bungalow courts
Buildings and structures in Urbana, Illinois
Houses in Champaign County, Illinois
Houses on the National Register of Historic Places in Illinois
Historic districts on the National Register of Historic Places in Illinois
National Register of Historic Places in Champaign County, Illinois
Spanish Colonial Revival architecture in Illinois